The number of national daily newspapers in Germany was 598 in 1950, whereas it was 375 in 1965. Below is a list of newspapers in Germany, sorted according to printed run as of 2015, as listed at ivw.de which tracks circulations of all publications in Germany.

National subscription papers

Daily national subscription papers
{| class="wikitable sortable" border="1"
! No.
! Newspaper
! Abbrv.
! Circulation (January, 2018)
! Frequency
! Political alignment
! Publisher/Parent Company
|-
|-
| 1
| Bild
| Bild
| style="text-align: right;" |1,150,181 (2020) |
| Monday - Saturday
| centre-right
|Axel Springer AG (Axel Springer Gesellschaft für Publizistik GmbH & Co. (Friede Springer))
|-
| 2
| Süddeutsche Zeitung| SZ
| style="text-align: right;" | 361,507
| Monday - Saturday
| centre-left/ left-liberal or "critical-liberal" 
| Südwestdeutsche Medien Holding (Gruppe Württembergischer Verleger (Neue Pressegesellschaft mbh & Co. KG (Eberhard Ebner))), Medien Union (Dieter Schaub)
|-
| 3
| Frankfurter Allgemeine Zeitung| FAZ
| style="text-align: right;" | 254,263
| Monday - Friday
| centre-right/ moderately conservative to liberal
| Fazit-Stiftung
|-
| 4
| Die Welt|
| style="text-align: right;" | 165,686
| Monday - Friday
| centre-right/ conservative to liberal
| Axel Springer AG (Axel Springer Gesellschaft für Publizistik GmbH & Co. (Friede Springer))
|-
| 5
| Handelsblatt|
| style="text-align: right;" | 130,864
| Monday - Friday
| economically liberal 
| Georg von Holtzbrinck Publishing Group (Monika Schoeller, Stefan von Holtzbrinck)
|-
| 6
| Der Tagesspiegel|
| style="text-align: right;" | 113,716
| Monday - Sunday
| liberal,University of Warwick - Warwick German Studies Web, Retrieved 14 March 2017. centrist
| Georg von Holtzbrinck Publishing Group (Monika Schoeller, Stefan von Holtzbrinck)
|-
| 7
| Die Tageszeitung| taz
| style="text-align: right;" | 51,873
| Monday - Saturday
| left-wing, green
| taz, die tageszeitung Verlagsgenossenschaft eG
|-
| 8
| Neues Deutschland| ND
| style="text-align: right;" | 25,158
| Monday - Saturday
| left-wing, socialist
| Neues Deutschland Druckerei und Verlags GmbH and The Left Party
|-
| 9
| Junge Welt| jW
| style="text-align: right;" | c. 19,000
| Monday - Saturday
| far-left, Marxist
| Verlag 8. Mai
|}

Weekly national subscription papers

 National news magazines 

 Der Spiegel (weekly (Saturday) left-liberal — 830,349 copies)
 Stern (weekly (Thursday) left-liberal — 734,859 copies)
 Focus (weekly (Saturday) liberal-conservative — 500,480 copies)
 Wirtschaftswoche (weekly (Friday) economically-liberal — 131,229 copies)
 Cicero (monthly liberal-conservative — 83,718 copies)
 konkret (monthly far-left — 42,398 copies)

Regional or local subscription papers in Germany (not exhaustive)Aachener Zeitung (110,017 copies including Aachener Nachrichten) — http://www.az-web.deAugsburger Allgemeine (215,460 copies)Badische Neueste Nachrichten (Karlsruhe) (121,765 copies) — http://www.bnn.de/Badische Zeitung (Freiburg) (137,111 copies)Berliner Morgenpost (127,469 copies)Berliner Zeitung (107,610 copies)Braunschweiger Zeitung (112,859 copies)Freie Presse (Chemnitz) (241,560)Frankfurter Rundschau/FNP (Frankfurt) (59,371)General-Anzeiger (Bonn) (58,000 copies)Hamburger Abendblatt (192,800 copies)Hannoversche Allgemeine Zeitung (476,059 copies including Neue Presse and various local editions)Hessische/Niedersächsische Allgemeine (Kassel) (176,185 copies)Hochheimer Zeitung — http://www.hochheimer-zeitung.de/index.htmKieler NachrichtenKölner Stadt-Anzeiger (273,382)Lausitzer Rundschau (87,374 copies)Leipziger Volkszeitung (184,337 copies)Lübecker Nachrichten (96,957 copies)Main-Post (Würzburg) (117,671 copies) — http://www.main-post.de/Märkische Allgemeine (Potsdam) (115,144 copies)Mittelbayerische Zeitung (Regensburg) (109,753 copies)Mitteldeutsche Zeitung (Halle) (181,154 copies)Münchner Merkur (185,931 copies)Neue Osnabrücker Zeitung (158,283 copies)Neue Ruhr Zeitung (Essen) (121,125 copies) — https://www.derwesten.de/nrz/Neue Westfälische (Bielefeld) (220,208 copies) — http://www.nw.de/Nordkurier (75,676 copies)Nordwest-Zeitung (116,391 copies) — http://www.nwzonline.de/Nürnberger Nachrichten (253,802 copies including Nürnberger Zeitung)Oberhessische Presse (24,977 copies)Ostsee-Zeitung (Rostock) (143,596 copies)Passauer Neue Presse (156,244 copies)Pforzheimer Zeitung (34,951 copies)Rheinische Post (Düsseldorf) (302,822 copies)Die Rheinpfalz (Ludwigshafen) (228,943 copies)Rhein-Zeitung (Koblenz) (183,655 copies) — http://www.rhein-zeitung.de/Ruhr Nachrichten (Dortmund) (109,149 copies)Saarbrücker Zeitung (136,999 copies)Sächsische Zeitung (Dresden) (227,940 copies)Schwäbische Zeitung (Ravensburg) (166,305 copies)Schwarzwälder Bote (Oberndorf am Neckar) (114,661 copies) — http://www.schwarzwaelder-bote.de/Schweriner Volkszeitung (Schwerin) (80,659 copies)Stuttgarter Zeitung (175,172 copies including Stuttgarter Nachrichten)Südkurier (Konstanz) (123,335 copies)Südwest-Presse (Ulm) (275,834 copies)Thüringer Allgemeine (Erfurt) (165,591 copies)Volksstimme (Magdeburg) (173,524 copies)Weser-Kurier (Bremen) (148,855 copies including Bremer Nachrichten and Verdener Nachrichten) – http://www.weser-kurier.de/Westdeutsche Allgemeine Zeitung (Essen) (397,145 copies)Westdeutsche Zeitung (Düsseldorf) (79,116 copies)Westfalen-Blatt (Bielefeld) (114,794 copies) — http://www.westfalen-blatt.de/Westfalenpost (Hagen) (115,239 copies) — https://www.derwesten.de/wp/Westfälische Nachrichten (Münster) (114,079 copies including Münstersche Zeitung) — http://www.westfaelische-nachrichten.de/Westfälischer Anzeiger (Hamm) (127.798) — http://www.wa.de/Westfälische Rundschau (Dortmund) (115,000) — http://www.wr.de/

Boulevard papers ("tabloid" style)Boulevardzeitungen (sometimes translated as "popular papers") is a style of newspapers, characterised by big, colourful headlines, pictures and sensationalist stories, comparable to the English term "red top" or "tabloid", but independent from the paper format (the most widespread boulevard paper actually has a Broadsheet format). Also called Kaufzeitungen or Straßenverkaufszeitungen ("street sale papers"), as they can only be bought day by day at kiosks or from street vendors and are not usually delivered to subscribers (Munich's Abendzeitung being a notable exception).

National boulevard papersBild (2,086,125 copies)
 also called "Bildzeitung"; with several regional editions like Bild Hamburg or Bild Köln. The Bild can be compared to tabloids, but the page size is bigger (broadsheet).Bild has a Sunday sister newspaper (which is a tabloid both in terms of style and paper format), Bild am Sonntag (1,118,497 copies), edited by a separate desk.

Regional or local boulevard papersExpress in Cologne and the Rhineland  (132,836 copies)tz (Munich) (120,533)B.Z. (Berlin)  (116,848 copies)Berliner Kurier  (96,352 copies)Hamburger Morgenpost  (83,096 copies)Abendzeitung (51,310 copies, unlike other Boulevard papers, about half of the copies are delivered to subscribers)

 Non-German-language newspapersFlensborg Avis — in Danish, published in Flensburg Handelsblatt Global Edition —  in English, published in BerlinHürriyet —  in Turkish, published in Mörfelden-WalldorfKaradeniz —  in Turkish
 The Munich Eye —  in English, published in  MunichSerbske Nowiny — in Sorbian (in Bautzen, Sachsen)Stars and Stripes —  in English, published in GriesheimVesti —  in Serbian, published in or near Frankfurt am MainYeni Özgür Politika—  in Turkish, published in Neu-IsenburgBerlinObserver—  in English, published in or near Germany

See also
 History of newspapers and magazines#Germany
 Media of Germany
 List of German magazines
 Informationsgemeinschaft zur Feststellung der Verbreitung von Werbeträgern
 Full list of modern German newspapers (in German)
 Full list of antiquarian German newspapers (in German)
 List of newspapers (by country)

References

Further reading
 
 Olson, Kenneth E.  The History Makers: The Press of Europe from hits Beginnings through 1965 (1967) pp 99-134
 Collins, Ross F., and E. M. Palmegiano, eds. The Rise of Western Journalism 1815-1914: Essays on the Press in Australia, Canada, France, Germany, Great Britain and the United States (2007)
 Ross, Corey. Mass Communications, Society, and Politics from the Empire to the Third Reich (Oxford University press 2010) 448pp
 Esser, Frank, and Michael Brüggemann. "The strategic crisis of German newspapers." in David AL Levy and Rasmus Kleis Nielsen, eds. Changing Business of Journalism and its Implication for Democracy (Reuters Institute for the Study of Journalism, University of Oxford, 2010) pp: 39-54.
 Thode, Ernest, ed. Historic German Newspapers Online (2014)

External links
WorldNewsList.com Deutsche Zeitungen
NewspaperIndex.com List of Online Newspapers in Germany
ThePaperboy.com List of Online Newspapers in Germany

Germany
 
Newspapers